Goli or Geli or Golli, sometimes rendered as Guli, in Iran may refer to:
 Goli, Ardabil
 Goli, Khalkhal, Ardabil Province
 Golli, Nir, Ardabil Province
 Goli, Charuymaq, East Azerbaijan Province
 Geli, Kermanshah
 Guli, Kermanshah
 Goli, North Khorasan
 Goli, Sistan and Baluchestan
 Goli, West Azerbaijan
 Guli, West Azerbaijan
 Goli, Zanjan